The 6th Grand Prix de Paris was a Non-Championship Formula Two motor race held on 25 May 1952 at the Autodrome de Linas-Montlhéry, in Montlhéry, Essonne, France. Race distance was decided not by distance but by time, the duration being 3 hours. The race was won by Piero Taruffi in a Ferrari 500, setting fastest lap in the process. Taruffi's teammates Giuseppe Farina and André Simon shared second place, with Louis Rosier third in his own Ferrari 500. Robert Manzon started from pole in a Gordini Type 16 but retired with a differential failure.

Results

References

Paris
Paris
Paris